Garoto Cósmico is a 2007 Brazilian animated film directed by Alê Abreu. The film debuted at the 2007 Anima Mundi, and was theatrically released in Brazil on January 11, 2008.

The film featured several Brazilian singers and actors such as Arnaldo Antunes, Vanessa da Mata, Wellington Nogueira and Belchior. It was the last film in which the actor Raul Cortez participated, voicing the character Giramundos.

Plot
Cósmico, Luna and Maninho are children of a futuristic world where lives are totally programmed. One night, seeking to gain more points for a school bonus, the three children get lost in space and discover an infinite universe, forgotten in a small circus. After living new experiences, the world of programming sends a special representative to rescue them. Now they must choose their own paths.

References

External links
  
 

2007 animated films
2007 films
Brazilian animated films
Brazilian children's films
Films directed by Alê Abreu
2007 directorial debut films